Vinegar Hill Township is one of twenty-three townships in Jo Daviess County, Illinois, USA.  As of the 2010 census, its population was 364 and it contained 143 housing units.  Its name changed from Mann Township on September 18, 1857.

Geography

Major highways
  Illinois Route 84.

Demographics

School districts
 Galena Unit School District 120.

Political districts
 Illinois' 16th congressional district.
 State House District 89.
 State Senate District 45.

Notable People
 T. Harry Williams, historian who received Pulitzer Prize, was born in Vinegar Hill

References
 
 United States Census Bureau 2007 TIGER/Line Shapefiles
 United States National Atlas

External links
 Jo Daviess County official site.
 City-Data.com.
 Illinois State Archives.
 Township Officials of Illinois.

Townships in Jo Daviess County, Illinois
Townships in Illinois
1852 establishments in Illinois